The Canadian Review of Studies in Nationalism was a peer-reviewed academic journal covering research on nationalism and related issues. It was established in 1973 at the University of Prince Edward Island by its editor-in-chief, Thomas Spira. The journal was published annually until it was discontinued in 2005.

External links 
 Online tables of content

Publications established in 1973
Publications disestablished in 2004
Political science journals
Multilingual journals
Annual journals
1973 establishments in Prince Edward Island
2004 disestablishments in Prince Edward Island